Milorad "Peko" Peković (Montenegrin and ; born 5 August 1977) is a Montenegrin former professional footballer who played as a midfielder. He spent most of his club career in Germany and represented the Montenegro national team at international level.

Club career
Born in Nikšić, SR Montenegro, SFR Yugoslavia (now Montenegro), he grew up in Serbia where he moved to as a young boy and started playing football within FK Obilić's youth ranks in 1987. Significant were the two seasons he played for Serbian giants Partizan having played 54 games for the club and scoring 5 goals. Before finally coming to Germany he spent one season in another Belgrade club, the OFK Belgrade where he had already been playing between 1994 and 1999. His most successful spell was with 1. FSV Mainz 05, with whom he spent five seasons.  In 2010, he joined SpVgg Greuther Fürth, with whom he played for two seasons including one in the Bundesliga. In May 2013 he signed for F.C. Hansa Rostock before returning to former club Eintracht Trier a year later.

International career
Peković made his debut for Montenegro in a September 2007 friendly match against Sweden and has earned a total of 34 caps, scoring no goals. His final international was an August 2013 friendly against Belarus.

Honours
Partizan Belgrade
 Yugoslav Cup: 2001

Greuther Fürth
 2. Bundesliga: 2012

References

External links
 
 
 

1977 births
Living people
Footballers from Nikšić
Association football midfielders
Serbia and Montenegro footballers
Montenegrin footballers
Montenegro international footballers
OFK Beograd players
FK Partizan players
SV Eintracht Trier 05 players
1. FSV Mainz 05 players
SpVgg Greuther Fürth players
FC Hansa Rostock players
First League of Serbia and Montenegro players
2. Bundesliga players
Bundesliga players
3. Liga players
Regionalliga players
Serbia and Montenegro expatriate footballers
Montenegrin expatriate footballers
Serbia and Montenegro expatriate sportspeople in Germany
Montenegrin expatriate sportspeople in Germany
Expatriate footballers in Germany